Perkiomenville is an unincorporated community in Montgomery County, Pennsylvania, United States. Perkiomenville is located in the Philadelphia-Camden-Wilmington metro area of the Northeastern United States. The community is in the Eastern Standard time zone and is located on both sides of the Perkiomen Creek, which separates Marlborough Township and Upper Frederick Township. Route 29 runs north-to-south through the village.

The community takes its name from nearby Perkiomen Creek.

Notable people
John William Ditter Jr., U.S. District Court judge
Eunice "Kitty" Ernst, a pioneer of the nurse-midwife movement in the United States.
Ed Hake, football player
David Reilly, Music artist
Stella James Sims, biologist at Bluefield State College
Jeff Turzo, Music artist
Paul Collins, American Writer

References

Unincorporated communities in Montgomery County, Pennsylvania
Unincorporated communities in Pennsylvania